The 1998 Maine gubernatorial election took place on November 3, 1998. Independent Governor Angus King sought a second and final term as governor. King faced off against former United States Congressman James B. Longley Jr., the Republican nominee; attorney Thomas J. Connolly, the Democratic nominee; and several other independent candidates, including Green candidate Pat LaMarche, who would later serve as the Green Party's Vice Presidential nominee in the 2004 presidential election.

This election was the first since 1982 in which the winning candidate received greater than 50% of the vote. This was not achieved again until 2018. , this was the last time a third-party or independent candidate won the governorship of Maine.

Democratic primary

Candidates
Thomas J. Connolly, attorney and activist
Joseph Ricci, founder of the Élan School

Results

Republican primary

Candidates
Henry L. Joy, State Representative
James B. Longley Jr., former U.S. Representative and son of former Governor James B. Longley, Sr.
Leo G. Martin

Results

General election

Candidates
Angus King (Independent), incumbent Governor of Maine
Thomas J. Connolly (Democratic), attorney
James B. Longley Jr. (Republican), former U.S. Representative and son of former Governor James B. Longley, Sr.
Pat LaMarche (Green), public figure and activist
William P. Clarke Jr. (Constitution)

Results

References

Gubernatorial
1998
Maine